Ney Fabiano de Oliveira (born February 9, 1979), more commonly known as "Ney Fabiano", is a Brazilian retired footballer.

Club career
Ney Fabiano spent the early part of his career playing for various clubs in Brazil, before moving to Austria for a spell. Fabiano then moved to ply his trade in Thailand where he signed with Thailand Tobacco Monopoly FC. In his first season in Thai football he became the top goal scorer in the 2007 Thai Premier League (TPL) with 18 goals, despite his team’s 6th-place finish. After showing his ability in front of goal, Chonburi FC snapped him up for their 2008 AFC Champions League campaign.

Melbourne Victory
On 23 May 2008, Australian A-League club Melbourne Victory announced that, after two impressive performances against them in the 2008 AFC Champions League (including a goal each over the two legs played), they had signed Fabiano on a two-year deal. Shortly after this announcement Fabiano was granted an Australian work permit, and his transfer to Melbourne Victory was formally completed when the A-League transfer window reopened on 1 July 2008. Fabiano is quoted as saying that he wants to approach his new surroundings in a professional manner in order to help him adapt quicker to the higher standard of the A-League. Fabiano impressed in pre-season scoring 2 goals for his new suitors, a tap-in during a friendly match vs Whittlesea Zebras, and a bullet header the following week against Adelaide United in the 2008/09 A-League Pre-Season Cup.

Ney Fabiano scored his first regular season goal in Round 2 2008–09 against Wellington Phoenix. He received a red card in the round 4 match against Adelaide United after being accused of spitting at defender Robert Cornthwaite. The charge was sent straight to the tribunal and on the 17 September, the red card was upgraded to an eight match ban in addition to the mandatory one match suspension. Through an appeal this charge was reduced to a 6 match ban.

Ney Fabiano solidified his place as a fan favorite in Round 17 2008–09, when he scored the 80th-minute winner against rivals Sydney FC in a 3–2 win, celebrating the goal by jumping over the advertising boards and performing a samba dance in front of the home end.

On December 1, 2009 it was revealed that Fabiano was leaving Melbourne had signed a contract with Thai Premier League team Bangkok Glass FC for the 2010 season.

Honours
With Melbourne Victory:
 A-League Championship: 2008–2009
 A-League Premiership: 2008–2009
With Chonburi FC:
 Kor Royal Cup: 2008
Personal Honours:
 Thai Premier League Top Scorer: 2007 with Thailand Tobacco Monopoly FC – 18 goals

References

External links
 Ultimate A-League profile

1979 births
Living people
A-League Men players
Brazilian footballers
Ney Fabiano
Ney Fabiano
Cruzeiro Esporte Clube players
Clube Atlético Sorocaba players
Melbourne Victory FC players
Nacional Futebol Clube players
Sociedade Esportiva Palmeiras players
São José Esporte Clube players
São Paulo FC players
Esporte Clube Bahia players
Brazilian expatriate sportspeople in Thailand
Sport Club Internacional players
Expatriate footballers in Thailand
Expatriate soccer players in Australia
Association football forwards
People from São José dos Campos
Footballers from São Paulo (state)